Music theory has existed since the advent of writing in ancient times. The earliest known practitioners include primarily Greek and some Chinese scholars. A few Indian sages such as Bharata Muni (Natya Shastra) are also credited with important treatises. Though much is lost, substantial treatises on ancient Greek music theory survive, including those by Aristoxenus, Nicomachus, Ptolemy and Porphyry. The influential Yue Jing Classic of Music from China is lost, though a few Ancient Chinese theorists from the Han dynasty and later have surviving contributions, such as Jing Fang and Xun Xu.

Writers of late antiquity—particularly Boethius, Cassiodorus and Isidore of Seville—were crucial in translating and transmitting much thought on music theory from classical antiquity to medieval Europe. However, the information relayed to the Post-classical era was minimal and European medieval theorists frequently misinterpreted what little Greek writings had been preserved. Important medieval European theorists include Hucbald, Guido of Arezzo, Johannes Cotto, Franco of Cologne, Philippe de Vitry. Many medieval music manuscripts of Europe were anonymous, and later compilers such as Martin Gerbert and Edmond de Coussemaker assigned names to unknown authors, such as 'Anonymous IV'. Concurrent with medieval Europe, scholars of the emerging Islamic Golden Age often more readily and thoroughly engaged with ancient Greek music treatises. Many Arab and Persian music theorists of this time have surviving works, such as Abu al-Faraj al-Isfahani, Safi al-Din al-Urmawi, Qutb al-Din al-Shirazi and Abd al-Qadir Maraghi. Theorists of the Byzantine Empire include George Pachymeres and Manuel Chrysaphes.

By the 15th century, European theorists were readily discussing the qualities of Renaissance music, with theorists such Johannes Tinctoris and Gioseffo Zarlino making important contributions to the study of counterpoint. Zarlino and Nicola Vicentino developed new theories on musical tuning, a topic which Vicentino publicly debated on with theorist Vicente Lusitano. At this time, the quality and quantity of Turkic musical sources increased, due to the rise of the Ottoman Empire. This laid the foundation of an 18th-century musical golden age in Eastern Europe and the Middle East, exemplified by composer-theorists such as Kasımpaşalı Osman Effendi, Dimitrie Cantemir and Abdülbaki Nasır Dede. Meanwhile, the Age of Enlightenment and the common practice period in Europe led to substantial changes in the nature of published music theory.

Antiquity

6th–14th centuries

15th and 16th centuries

17th century

18th century

19th century

20th century – present

References

Notes

Citations

Sources

 
 
 
 
 
 
 
 
 
 
 
 
 
  (In )
  
  (In )
  (In )
  (In )
 
 
 
 

Music theory lists